The Norceca Beach Volleyball Circuit is a sport competition for national teams in the sport of beach volleyball.

The championship combines events for men and women, and is held annually, organized by the North, Central America and Caribbean Volleyball Confederation (NORCECA).

Men's tournament

History

Women's tournament

History

References
 BVB Info
 Norceca

 
Recurring sporting events established in 2007
Beach volleyball competitions
Beach volleyball in North America